Kyle Rowley (born January 30, 1979) is an arena football quarterback who is currently a free agent. He also played in the former af2. He played college football at Brown.

Rowley was the first quarterback to win an AFL ArenaBowl and af2 ArenaCup Championship, with Nick Davila being the second. His personal career accolades include 2006 ArenaCup Player of the Game, 2008 af2 Offensive Player of the Year, and 2010 ArenaBowl XXIII Championship MVP. During his career he broke the all-time AFL Record for touchdown passes in a game (12 TDs vs. San Jose in 2011), broke the all-time record for touchdown passes in an AFL ArenaBowl (10 TDs vs Tampa Bay in 2010). Prior to his AFL career he was voted by af2 coaches and league officials in 2009 as one of the top ten signal callers in league history. He has led the AFL in passer rating and touchdowns, led the af2 in single season completion percentage and completions (2004), passer rating and touchdown/interception ratio (2006) touchdowns and touchdown passes (2008) and passing yards (2009).  He also holds every Arkansas Twister and Columbus Wardog franchise passing records. He started his Arena Football career in 2003 and has played for numerous AFL and af2 teams, including the Charleston Swamp Foxes (2003), Columbus Wardogs (2004), Wilkes-Barre/Scranton Pioneers (2005), Manchester Wolves (2006, Philadelphia Soul (2007), Grand Rapids Rampage (2007), Arkansas Twisters (2008 & 2009), the Spokane Shock (2006 & 2010–2012) and the Orlando Predators.

College career
Rowley attended Brown University from 1997 to 2001 and was a standout in the Ivy League, leading the league in every statistical passing category in his first and only season as the starter.  In his first home start he broke the school's single game passing record with a 474 yards performance and broke the school's single game total offense record with 485 yards.  He was part of one of only two Ivy League Championships in school history at the time (1999 Ivy League Champions) and recorded more varsity football wins while at Brown than any other player in school history till that time.

Professional career

Spokane Shock
In 2006, while the Spokane Shock were an expansion team in the af2, he was brought in mid-season and proceeded to go undefeated as a starter (9-0). He helped lead the team to a 17-2 overall record on the season, and an ArenaCup National Championship victory. He was named the ArenaCup Offensive Player of the Game and led the league that season in touchdown/interception ratio (22/1) and passer rating (127) .

Philadelphia Soul
After his ArenaCup championship, Rowley was picked up by the Philadelphia Soul in 2007 to begin his AFL career.

Grand Rapids Rampage
Later during the 2007 season he was traded to the Grand Rapids Rampage where he suffered a knee injury (ACL) in the final game of the season.

Arkansas Twisters
He spent the next two seasons playing for the af2's Arkansas Twisters. In the 2008 season, his first season back from ACL surgery, he threw a league leading 98 Touchdowns and 125 passer rating before being selected as the Schutt Offensive Player of the Year by a vote of head coaches and press.

Spokane Shock
With the return of the AFL in 2010 from bankruptcy in 2009, Rowley was picked up by the newest AFL franchise, the Spokane Shock, brought over from the disbanded af2, and proceeded to win yet another expansion year national championship for the franchise. Over the course of the 2010 season, Rowley tallied a league best 130 touchdowns, 5,159 passing yards, 444 completions, 123 passing touchdowns en route to leading the Shock to an ArenaBowl XXIII win and being named the ArenaBowl XXIII MVP.  In the league's final game Rowley set the record for Arena Bowl touchdown passes (9) and Arena Bowl total touchdowns (10) eclipsing the previous mark by two.

Prior to 2010 Rowley had played limited time for the AFL's Philadelphia Soul, and the Grand Rapids Rampage in second half of the 2007 season. After a knee injury in the final game of 2007, a return to the af2 in 2008, and an AFL league collapse in 2009, he returned to a revamped AFL in 2010 with the Spokane Shock. He signed with the Pittsburgh Power for the 2012 season but never actually played for them.  He was released due to the AFL player strike.

Rowley returned to the Spokane Shock for the fourth game of its season. Spokane's fortunes changed in the next game when Rowley, playing in his first home game for Spokane in 2012, helped the Shock defeat the Milwaukee Mustangs 57-26.  Rowley completed 20 of 26 for 214 yards and five touchdowns. And despite only playing in 15 of 18 games for the Shock in 2012, Rowley tallied 101 total touchdowns and in a crucial game verses San Jose, broke the all-time AFL record for passing touchdowns in a single game (12 touchdowns, which was tied later in the season by Tommy Grady).  Before that no one in the 25-year history of the league had ever thrown 12 touchdowns in a single game.

Orlando Predators
Rowley signed with the Orlando Predators for the 2013 season. Rowley appeared in five games for the Predators, ultimately being reassigned once the Predators made a trade for Aaron Garcia.

Jacksonville Sharks
Rowley was picked up two weeks later by the Jacksonville Sharks.

Return to Orlando
On April 9, 2014, Rowley was traded with Tracy Belton to the Predators to complete a trade for Aaron Garcia.

Portland Thunder
On April 14, 2014, Rowley was traded to the winless Portland Thunder for wide receiver Jeffrey Solomon. The traded reunited Rowley with Thunder head coach, Matthew Sauk, who was the Shock offensive coordinator when Rowley lead the Shock to an ArenaBowl title. Rowley proceeded to lead the winless Thunder to a 2014 playoff berth and a near upset of the defending champion Arizona Rattlers. Sauk was fired after the 2014 season. When the Thunder hired Mike Hohensee for 2015, Rowley once again lead the Thunder to an unlikely playoff berth out of the Western Conference.

Albany Empire
On July 19, 2018, Rowley was assigned to the Albany Empire.

Columbus Destroyers
WEEK THIRTEEN: ARENA FOOTBALL LEAGUE PLAYERS OF THE WEEK

OFFENSIVE: Kyle Rowley | QB, Columbus Destroyers
In what was his first Arena Football game since 2015, Columbus Destroyers QB, Kyle Rowley, earned the Week 13 Offensive Player of the Week honors. Rowley threw for 253 yards and five touchdowns in the Destroyers narrow 56-50 loss to the Valor to end the season. Rowley led the Destroyers to their second-most points scored this year (most, 54 on 6/7 @ A.C. Blackjacks).

His last appearance came during a playoff game with the Portland Thunder on 8/14/15. After his appearance with the Destroyers, Rowley is a nine-year veteran of the AFL.

AFL statistics

Stats from ArenaFan:

References

External links

1979 births
Living people
American football quarterbacks
Spokane Shock players
Players of American football from Rhode Island
Brown Bears football players
Pittsburgh Power players
Philadelphia Soul players
Manchester Wolves players
Bossier–Shreveport Battle Wings players
Grand Rapids Rampage players
Arkansas Twisters players
Wilkes-Barre/Scranton Pioneers players
Orlando Predators players
Jacksonville Sharks players
Portland Thunder players
Albany Empire (AFL) players
Sportspeople from Warwick, Rhode Island